Charlie Cavanaugh (born 6 November 2001) is a rugby league footballer who plays as a  for Hull Kingston Rovers in the Betfred Super League.

In 2022 he made his Hull KR Super League début against the Wigan Warriors.

References

External links
Hull KR profile

2001 births
Living people
English rugby league players
Hull Kingston Rovers players
Rugby league hookers
Rugby league players from Kingston upon Hull